Fudbalski klub Jedinstvo Putevi (Serbian Cyrillic: Фудбалски клуб Јединство Путeви) is a football club based in Užice, Serbia.

History
In the 2011–12 season, they finished 1st in the Serbian League West and gained promotion to the Serbian First League (second tier).

At the end of the first part of the 2012–13 season, Jedinstvo found themselves in 4th position and eventual fight for promotion. In the end, they finished 6th in their first season in the Serbian First League. In the 2014–15 season, Jedinstvo took 14th place and was relegated to the Serbian League West. In the Serbian League West, they spent 3 seasons, and in the 2017–18 seasons, it took 18th place and was relegated to the West Moravian Zone. In the final season of 2018–19, Jedinstvo takes the 12th place and barely opposes in the league. The 2019–20 season of the club ends at position number 5, after the interruption of the league due to the situation with the COVID-19 virus.

Serbian national team defender (and later the captain of Manchester United) Nemanja Vidić started off his career at FK Jedinstvo Putevi together with his older brother Dušan Vidić.

Recent seasons (2002–present)

Current squad

External links
 Official website
 Club profile and squad at Srbijafudbal
 Club info at FudbalskaZona
 Club page at SrbijaSport

Football clubs in Serbia
Association football clubs established in 1961
1961 establishments in Serbia